The following list shows all Labour Party Members of Parliament (MPs), Members of the European Parliament (MEPs), Constituency Labour Parties (CLPs), affiliated trades unions and socialist societies that nominated a candidate in the 2020 Labour Party leadership election.

Rebecca Long-Bailey

Members of Parliament 

 Diane Abbott, Shadow Home Secretary and MP for Hackney North and Stoke Newington
 Tahir Ali, MP for Birmingham Hall Green
 Paula Barker, MP for Liverpool Wavertree
 Apsana Begum, MP for Poplar and Limehouse
 Olivia Blake, MP for Sheffield Hallam
 Richard Burgon, Shadow Justice secretary and MP for Leeds East
 Ian Byrne, MP for Liverpool West Derby
 Dan Carden, Shadow Secretary of State for International Development and MP for Liverpool Walton
 Peter Dowd, Shadow Chief Secretary to the Treasury and MP for Bootle
 Mary Foy, MP for City of Durham
 Barry Gardiner, MP for Brent North and shadow secretary of state for international trade
 Margaret Greenwood, Shadow Work and Pensions secretary and MP for Wirral West
 Rachel Hopkins, MP for Luton South
 Imran Hussain, Shadow Justice minister and MP for Bradford East
 Kim Johnson, MP for Liverpool Riverside
 Ian Lavery, Chairman of the Labour Party and MP for Wansbeck
 Rebecca Long-Bailey (self)
 Andy McDonald, Shadow Transport secretary and MP for Middlesbrough
 John McDonnell, Shadow Chancellor of the Exchequer and MP for Hayes and Harlington
 Ian Mearns, MP for Gateshead
 Nav Mishra, MP for Stockport
 Grahame Morris, MP for Easington
 Kate Osborne, MP for Jarrow
 Angela Rayner, Shadow Secretary of State for Education and MP for Ashton-under-Lyne
 Bell Ribeiro-Addy, MP for Streatham
 Lloyd Russell-Moyle, MP for Brighton Kemptown (initially nominated Clive Lewis)
 Cat Smith, MP for Lancaster and Fleetwood and shadow leader of the House of Commons
 Zarah Sultana, MP for Coventry South
 Sam Tarry, MP for Ilford South
 Jon Trickett, MP for Hemsworth and shadow lord president of the council
 Claudia Webbe, MP for Leicester East
 Mick Whitley, MP for Birkenhead
 Beth Winter, MP for Cynon Valley

Constituency Labour Parties 

 Aberconwy CLP
 Almond Valley CLP
 Angus North and Mearns CLP
 Ashton-under-Lyne CLP
 Bath CLP
 Battersea CLP
 Berwick-upon-Tweed CLP
 Bexhill and Battle CLP
 Birkenhead CLP
 Birmingham Hall Green CLP
 Birmingham Hodge Hill CLP
 Blackley and Broughton CLP
 Blackpool South CLP
 Blyth Valley CLP
 Bognor Regis and Littlehampton CLP
 Bolton South East CLP
 Bolton West CLP
 Bootle CLP
 Boston and Skegness CLP
 Bournemouth East CLP
 Bournemouth West CLP
 Bradford East CLP
 Bradford West CLP (void)
 Brighton Kemptown CLP
 Brighton Pavilion CLP
 Bristol North West CLP
 Bristol West CLP
 Bromley and Chislehurst CLP
 Broxtowe CLP
 Calder Valley CLP
 Camberwell and  Peckham CLP
 Camborne and Redruth CLP
 Carmarthen East and Dinefwr CLP
 Ceredigion CLP
 Charnwood CLP
 Chatham and Aylesford CLP
 Cheltenham CLP
 Christchurch CLP
 Clacton CLP
 Cleethorpes CLP
 Clwyd South CLP
 Colchester CLP
 Copeland CLP
 Coventry North West CLP
 Crawley CLP
 Crewe and  Nantwich CLP
 Dartford CLP
 Dudley North CLP
 Dundee City East CLP
 Dundee City West CLP
 Easington CLP
 Ealing Southall CLP
 Eastbourne CLP
 Edinburgh Central CLP
 Edmonton CLP
 Ellesmere Port and Neston CLP
 Elmet and Rothwell CLP
 Enfield North CLP
 Erith and Thamesmead CLP
 Folkestone and Hythe CLP
 Fylde CLP
 Gainsborough CLP
 Glasgow Kelvin CLP
 Hackney North and Stoke Newington CLP
 Hackney South and Shoreditch CLP
 Harborough CLP
 Harrow East CLP
 Hastings and Rye CLP
 Hayes and Harlington CLP
 Hemsworth CLP
 Hereford and South Herefordshire CLP
 Heywood and Middleton CLP
 Hull North CLP
 Hull West and Hessle CLP
 Huntingdon CLP
 Kensington CLP
 Kilmarnock and Irvine Valley CLP
 Kingswood CLP
 Knowsley CLP
 Lancaster and Fleetwood CLP
 Leeds Central CLP
 Leeds East CLP
 Leicester West CLP
 Lewisham Deptford CLP
 Leyton and Wanstead CLP
 Lincoln CLP
 Liverpool Riverside CLP
 Liverpool Walton CLP
 Liverpool Wavertree CLP
 Liverpool West Derby CLP
 Ludlow CLP
 Luton North CLP
 Makerfield CLP
 Maldon CLP
 Manchester Central CLP
 Manchester Gorton CLP
 Mansfield CLP
 Mid Dorset and North Poole CLP
 Mid Sussex CLP
 Montgomeryshire CLP
 New Forest East CLP
 Newton Abbot CLP
 North Devon CLP
 North East Cambridgeshire CLP
 North Thanet CLP
 North West Cambridgeshire CLP
 Northampton North CLP
 North West Durham CLP
 Norwich North CLP
 Nottingham East CLP
 Orkney CLP
 Pendle CLP
 Penrith and The Border CLP
 Plymouth Moor View CLP
 Poole CLP
 Preston CLP
 Redcar CLP
 Romford CLP
 Rotherham CLP
 Salford and Eccles CLP
 Sedgefield CLP
 Sefton Central CLP
 Sherwood CLP
 Shetland CLP
 South Basildon and East Thurrock CLP
 South Holland and the Deepings CLP
 South Thanet
 South West Bedfordshire CLP
 South West Devon CLP
 South West Hertfordshire CLP
 Southampton Itchen CLP
 Southend West CLP  
 St Austell and Newquay CLP
 St Helens South and Whiston CLP
 Staffordshire Moorlands CLP
 Stockport CLP
 Stoke-on-Trent Central CLP
 Sutton and Cheam CLP
 Thornbury and Yate CLP
 Torridge and West Devon CLP
 Tottenham CLP
 Uddingston and Bellshill CLP
 Uxbridge and South Ruislip CLP
 Wakefield CLP
 Wallasey CLP
 Walsall South CLP
 Wansbeck CLP
 Warley CLP
 Weaver Vale CLP
 Wellingborough CLP
 Wells CLP
 West Bromwich West CLP
 West Dorset CLP
 West Ham CLP
 West Suffolk CLP
 Westmorland and Lonsdale CLP
 Weston-super-Mare CLP
 Windsor CLP
 Wirral South CLP
 Wirral West CLP
 Wolverhampton South West CLP
 Worsley and Eccles South CLP
 Worthing West CLP
 Wycombe CLP
 Yeovil CLP

Affiliated trades unions 
 Associated Society of Locomotive Engineers and Firemen (ASLEF)
 Bakers, Food and Allied Workers' Union (BFAWU)
 Communication Workers Union (CWU)
 Fire Brigades Union (FBU)
 Unite the Union

Socialist societies 
 Disability Labour
 Socialist Educational Association

Lisa Nandy

Members of Parliament 

 Jonathan Ashworth, shadow health secretary and MP for Leicester South
 Kevin Brennan, shadow arts and heritage minister and MP for Cardiff West
 Feryal Clark, MP for Enfield North
 Rosie Cooper, MP for West Lancashire
 Stella Creasy, MP for Walthamstow
 Jon Cruddas, MP for Dagenham and Rainham
 Tanmanjeet Singh Dhesi, Parliamentary Private Secretary to the Leader of the Opposition and MP for Slough
 Jack Dromey, shadow pensions minister and MP for Birmingham Erdington
 Yvonne Fovargue, MP for Makerfield
 Vicky Foxcroft, shadow civil society minister and MP for Lewisham Deptford
 Gill Furniss, shadow minister for steel, postal affairs, and consumer protection and MP for Sheffield Brightside and Hillsborough
 Kate Green, MP for Stretford and Urmston
 Lilian Greenwood, MP for Nottingham South
 Louise Haigh, shadow policing minister and MP for Sheffield Heeley
 Mark Hendrick, MP for Preston
 Sharon Hodgson, shadow public health minister and MP for Washington and Sunderland West
 Dan Jarvis, MP for Barnsley Central
 Ruth Jones, MP for Newport West
 Mike Kane, shadow schools minister and MP for Wythenshawe and Sale East
 Stephen Kinnock, MP for Aberavon
 Emma Lewell-Buck, MP for South Shields
 Tony Lloyd, Shadow Secretary of State for Scotland, Shadow Secretary of State for Northern Ireland and MP for Rochdale
 Justin Madders, MP for Ellesmere Port and Neston
 Lisa Nandy (self)
 Alex Norris, MP for Nottingham North
 Abena Oppong-Asare, MP for Erith and Thamesmead
 Taiwo Owatemi, MP for Coventry North West
 Sarah Owen, MP for Luton North
 Stephanie Peacock, MP for Barnsley East
 Graham Stringer, MP for Blackley and Broughton
 Derek Twigg, MP for Halton

Constituency Labour Parties 

 Aberavon CLP
 Arundel and South Downs CLP
 Ashfield CLP
 Ashford CLP
 Barnsley Central CLP
 Barnsley East CLP
 Bassetlaw CLP
 Bermondsey and Old Southwark CLP
 Birmingham Northfield CLP
 Birmingham Yardley CLP
 Blackpool North and Cleveleys CLP
 Bolsover CLP
 Broxbourne CLP
 Burnley CLP
 Bury North CLP
 Bury South CLP
 Cannock Chase CLP
 Chippenham CLP
 City of Durham CLP
 Clwyd West CLP
 Congleton CLP
 Coventry South CLP
 Croydon South CLP
 Cumbernauld and Kilsyth CLP
 Dagenham and Rainham CLP
 Delyn CLP
 Don Valley CLP
 Dudley South CLP
 Edinburgh Southern CLP
 Erewash CLP
 Faversham and Mid Kent CLP
 Gloucester CLP
 Gosport CLP
 Great Grimsby CLP
 Halton CLP
 Hazel Grove CLP
 Hull East CLP
 Kingston and Surbiton CLP
 Llanelli CLP
 Louth and Horncastle CLP
 Meon Valley CLP
 Middlesbrough CLP
 Mitcham and Morden CLP
 Morecambe and Lunesdale CLP
 Morley and Outwood CLP
 Newark CLP
 Newcastle-under-Lyme CLP
 North Dorset CLP
 North Warwickshire CLP
 North West Leicestershire CLP
 Northampton South CLP
 Nottingham North CLP
 Perthshire North CLP
 Perthshire South and Kinross-shire CLP
 Rother Valley CLP
 Ruislip, Northwood and Pinner CLP
 Sheffield Brightside and Hillsborough CLP
 Sheffield Heeley CLP
 Slough CLP
 South Derbyshire CLP
 Stockton South CLP
 Stoke-on-Trent North CLP
 Stretford and Urmston CLP
 Tooting CLP
 Vauxhall CLP
 Walthamstow CLP
 Warrington North CLP
 Wigan CLP
 Wokingham CLP
 Wolverhampton North East CLP
 Wythenshawe and Sale East CLP
 York Outer CLP

Affiliated trades unions 
 General, Municipal, Boilermakers (GMB)
 National Union of Mineworkers (NUM)

Socialist societies 
 Chinese for Labour
 Jewish Labour Movement

Keir Starmer

Members of Parliament 

 Debbie Abrahams, MP for Oldham East and Saddleworth
 Rushanara Ali, MP for Bethnal Green and Bow
 Mike Amesbury, Shadow Minister for Employment and MP for Weaver Vale
 Fleur Anderson, MP for Putney
 Margaret Beckett, MP for Derby South
 Hilary Benn, MP for Leeds Central
 Clive Betts, MP for Sheffield South East
 Paul Blomfield, shadow Brexit minister and MP for Sheffield Central
 Tracy Brabin, Shadow Secretary of State for Digital, Culture, Media and Sport and MP for Batley and Spen
 Ben Bradshaw, MP for Exeter
 Nick Brown, opposition chief whip and MP for Newcastle upon Tyne East
 Karen Buck, MP for Westminster North
 Alan Campbell, MP for Tynemouth
 Bambos Charalambous, MP for Enfield Southgate
 Yvette Cooper, former Shadow Home Secretary and MP for Normanton, Pontefract and Castleford
 Judith Cummins, shadow international trade minister and MP for Bradford South
 Alex Cunningham, MP for Stockton North
 Janet Daby, MP for Lewisham East
 Wayne David, shadow armed forces minister and MP for Caerphilly
 Geraint Davies, MP for Swansea West
 Thangam Debbonaire, shadow Brexit minister and MP for Bristol West
 Marsha de Cordova, shadow minister for Disabled People and MP for Battersea
 Anneliese Dodds, shadow Treasury minister and MP for Oxford East
 Stephen Doughty, MP for Cardiff South and Penarth
 Angela Eagle, MP for Wallasey
 Maria Eagle, MP for Garston and Halewood
 Clive Efford, MP for Eltham
 Chris Elmore, Opposition Whip and MP for Ogmore
 Florence Eshalomi, MP for Vauxhall
 Bill Esterson, shadow international trade minister and MP for Sefton Central
 Chris Evans, MP for Islwyn
 Preet Gill, shadow international development minister and MP for Birmingham Edgbaston
 Mary Glindon, MP for North Tyneside
 Andrew Gwynne, Shadow Secretary of State for Communities and Local Government and MP for Denton and Reddish
 Emma Hardy, MP for Kingston upon Hull West and Hessle
 Carolyn Harris, Deputy Leader of Welsh Labour, shadow home affairs and women and equalities minister and MP for Swansea East
 Helen Hayes, MP for Dulwich and West Norwood
 John Healey, shadow housing secretary and MP for Wentworth and Dearne
 Mike Hill, MP for Hartlepool
 Kate Hollern, MP for Blackburn
 George Howarth, MP for Knowsley
 Rupa Huq, MP for Ealing Central and Acton
 Diana Johnson, MP for Kingston upon Hull North
 Kevan Jones, MP for North Durham
 Sarah Jones, shadow housing minister and MP for Croydon Central
 Barbara Keeley, shadow minister for mental health and social care and MP for Worsley and Eccles South
 David Lammy, MP for Tottenham
 Seema Malhotra, MP for Feltham and Heston
 Chris Matheson, shadow cabinet office minister and MP for the City of Chester
 Steve McCabe, MP for Birmingham Selly Oak
 Kerry McCarthy, MP for Bristol East
 Conor McGinn, MP for St Helens North
 Jim McMahon, shadow local government minister and MP for Oldham West and Royton
 Anna McMorrin, MP for Cardiff North
 Ed Miliband, former Labour Party leader and MP for Doncaster North
 Jessica Morden, Opposition Whip and MP for Newport East
 Stephen Morgan, MP for Portsmouth South
 Matthew Pennycook, MP for Greenwich and Woolwich
 Toby Perkins, MP for Chesterfield
 Bridget Phillipson, MP for Houghton and Sunderland South
 Luke Pollard, MP for Plymouth Sutton & Devonport
 Steve Reed, shadow children and families minister and MP for Croydon North
 Christina Rees, shadow Wales secretary and MP for Neath
 Ellie Reeves, MP for Lewisham West and Penge
 Jonathan Reynolds, shadow economic secretary to the Treasury and MP for Stalybridge and Hyde
 Marie Rimmer, MP for St Helens South and Whiston
 Virendra Sharma, MP for Ealing Southall
 Barry Sheerman, MP for Huddersfield
 Tulip Siddiq, MP for Hampstead and Kilburn
 Andy Slaughter, MP for Hammersmith
 Jeff Smith, MP for Manchester Withington
 Nick Smith, Opposition Whip and MP for Blaenau Gwent
 Karin Smyth, MP for Bristol South
 Jo Stevens, MP for Cardiff Central
 Mark Tami, Opposition Whip and MP for Alyn and Deeside
 Nick Thomas-Symonds, shadow solicitor general for England and Wales, shadow secretary of state for security and MP for Torfaen
 Stephen Timms, MP for East Ham
 Karl Turner, MP for Kingston upon Hull East
 Valerie Vaz, shadow leader of the House of Commons and MP for Walsall South
 Alan Whitehead, shadow energy minister and MP for Southampton Test
 Mohammad Yasin, MP for Bedford
 Daniel Zeichner, MP for Cambridge

Members of the European Parliament 
 Richard Corbett, MEP for Yorkshire and the Humber
 Neena Gill, MEP for West Midlands
 Theresa Griffin, MEP for North West England
 Jackie Jones, MEP for Wales
 Claude Moraes, MEP for London
 Rory Palmer, MEP for East Midlands

Constituency Labour Parties 

 Aberdeen Central CLP
 Aberdeen Donside CLP
 Aberdeen South and North Kincardine CLP
 Aberdeenshire West CLP
 Airdrie and Shotts CLP
 Aldershot CLP
 Aldridge-Brownhills CLP
 Altrincham and Sale West CLP
 Alyn and Deeside CLP
 Amber Valley CLP
 Angus South CLP
 Argyll and Bute CLP
 Aylesbury CLP
 Ayr CLP
 Banbury CLP
 Banffshire and Buchan Coast CLP
 Barking CLP
 Barrow and Furness CLP
 Basildon and Billericay CLP
 Basingstoke CLP
 Batley and Spen CLP
 Beaconsfield CLP
 Beckenham CLP
 Bedford CLP
 Bethnal Green and Bow CLP
 Beverley and Holderness CLP
 Bexleyheath and Crayford CLP
 Birmingham Edgbaston CLP
 Birmingham Erdington CLP
 Birmingham Ladywood CLP
 Birmingham Perry Barr CLP
 Birmingham Selly Oak CLP
 Blackburn CLP
 Blaenau Gwent CLP
 Blaydon CLP
 Bolton North East CLP
 Bosworth CLP
 Bracknell CLP
 Bradford South CLP
 Braintree CLP
 Brecon and Radnorshire CLP
 Brent Central CLP
 Brent North CLP
 Brentford and Isleworth CLP
 Bridgend CLP
 Bridgwater and West Somerset CLP
 Brigg and Goole CLP
 Bristol East CLP
 Bristol South CLP
 Bromsgrove CLP
 Buckingham CLP
 Burton CLP
 Bury St Edmunds CLP
 Caerphilly CLP
 Caithness, Sutherland and Ross CLP
 Cambridge CLP
 Cardiff Central CLP
 Cardiff South and Penarth CLP
 Cardiff West CLP
 Carlisle CLP
 Carrick, Cumnock and Doon Valley CLP
 Carshalton and Wallington CLP
 Castle Point CLP
 Central Devon CLP
 Central Suffolk and North Ipswich CLP
 Cheadle CLP
 Chelmsford CLP
 Chelsea and Fulham CLP
 Chesham and Amersham CLP
 Chesterfield CLP
 Chichester CLP
 Chingford and Woodford Green CLP
 Chipping Barnet CLP
 Chorley CLP
 Cities of London and Westminster CLP
 City of Chester CLP
 Clackmannanshire and Dunblane CLP
 Clydebank and Milngavie CLP
 Coatbridge and Chryston CLP
 Colne Valley CLP
 Corby CLP
 Coventry North East CLP
 Croydon Central CLP
 Croydon North CLP
 Cunninghame North CLP
 Cunninghame South CLP
 Cynon Valley CLP
 Darlington CLP
 Daventry CLP
 Denton and Reddish CLP
 Derby North CLP
 Derby South CLP
 Derbyshire Dales CLP
 Devizes CLP
 Dewsbury CLP
 Doncaster Central CLP
 Doncaster North CLP
 Dover CLP
 Dulwich and West Norwood CLP
 Dumbarton CLP
 Dumfriesshire CLP
 Dunfermline CLP
 Dwyfor Meirionnydd CLP
 Ealing Central and Acton CLP
 Ealing North CLP
 East Devon CLP
 East Ham CLP
 East Hampshire CLP
 East Kilbride CLP
 East Lothian CLP
 East Surrey CLP
 East Worthing and Shoreham CLP
 East Yorkshire CLP
 Eastwood CLP
 Eddisbury CLP
 Edinburgh Eastern CLP
 Edinburgh North and Leith CLP
 Edinburgh Pentlands CLP
 Edinburgh West CLP
 Eltham CLP
 Enfield Southgate CLP
 Epping Forest CLP
 Epsom and Ewell CLP
 Exeter CLP
 Falkirk West CLP
 Fareham CLP
 Feltham and Heston CLP
 Finchley and Golders Green CLP
 Filton and Bradley Stoke CLP
 Galloway and West Dumfries CLP
 Garston and Halewood CLP
 Gedling CLP
 Gillingham and Rainham CLP
 Glasgow Anniesland CLP
 Glasgow Cathcart CLP
 Glasgow Maryhill and Springburn CLP
 Glasgow Pollok CLP
 Glasgow Provan CLP
 Glasgow Shettleston CLP
 Glasgow Southside CLP
 Gower CLP
 Grantham and Stamford CLP
 Gravesham CLP
 Great Yarmouth CLP
 Greenock and Inverclyde CLP
 Greenwich and Woolwich CLP
 Halesowen and Rowley Regis CLP
 Halifax CLP
 Haltemprice and Howden CLP
 Hamilton, Larkhall and Stonehouse CLP
 Hammersmith CLP
 Hampstead and Kilburn CLP
 Harlow CLP
 Harrogate and Knaresborough CLP
 Harrow West CLP
 Hartlepool CLP
 Harwich and North Essex CLP
 Havant CLP
 Hemel Hempstead CLP
 Hendon CLP
 Henley CLP
 Hertford and Stortford CLP
 Hertsmere CLP
 Hexham CLP
 High Peak CLP
 Hitchin and Harpenden CLP
 Holborn and St Pancras CLP
 Hornchurch and Upminster CLP
 Hornsey and Wood Green CLP
 Houghton and Sunderland South CLP
 Hove CLP
 Huddersfield CLP
 Hyndburn CLP
 Ilford North CLP
 Ilford South CLP
 Inverness and Nairn CLP
 Ipswich CLP
 Isle of Wight CLP
 Islington North CLP
 Islwyn CLP
 Jarrow CLP
 Keighley CLP
 Kenilworth and Southam CLP
 Kirkcaldy CLP
 Labour International CLP
 Leeds North East CLP
 Leeds North West CLP
 Leeds West CLP
 Leicester East CLP
 Leicester South CLP
 Leigh CLP
 Lewes CLP
 Lewisham East CLP
 Lewisham West and Penge CLP
 Lichfield CLP
 Linlithgow CLP
 Loughborough CLP
 Luton South CLP
 Macclesfield CLP
 Maidenhead CLP
 Maidstone and the Weald CLP
 Manchester Withington CLP
 Meriden CLP
 Merthyr Tydfil and Rhymney CLP
 Mid Bedfordshire CLP
 Mid Derbyshire CLP
 Mid Fife and Glenrothes CLP
 Mid Norfolk CLP
 Mid Worcestershire CLP
 Middlesbrough South and East Cleveland CLP
 Midlothian South, Tweeddale and Lauderdale CLP
 Milton Keynes CLP
 Milton Keynes South CLP
 Mole Valley CLP
 Monmouth CLP
 Moray CLP
 Motherwell and Wishaw CLP
 Na h-Eileanan an Iar CLP
 Neath CLP
 New Forest West CLP
 Newcastle upon Tyne Central CLP
 Newcastle upon Tyne East CLP
 Newcastle upon Tyne North CLP
 Newport East CLP
 Newport West CLP
 Normanton, Pontefract and Castleford CLP
 North Durham CLP
 North East Bedfordshire CLP
 North East Derbyshire CLP
 North East Fife CLP
 North East Hampshire CLP
 North East Hertfordshire CLP
 North East Somerset CLP
 North Herefordshire
 North Norfolk CLP
 North Shropshire CLP
 North Somerset CLP
 North Swindon CLP
 North Tyneside CLP
 North West Hampshire CLP
 North West Norfolk CLP
 North Wiltshire CLP
 Norwich South CLP
 Nottingham South CLP
 Nuneaton CLP
 Old Bexley and Sidcup CLP
 Oldham East and Saddleworth CLP
 Oldham West and Royton CLP
 Orpington CLP
 Oxford East CLP
 Oxford West and Abingdon CLP
 Paisley CLP
 Penistone and Stocksbridge CLP
 Peterborough CLP
 Plymouth Sutton and Devonport CLP
 Pontypridd CLP
 Poplar and Limehouse CLP
 Portsmouth North CLP
 Portsmouth South CLP
 Preseli Pembrokeshire CLP
 Pudsey CLP
 Putney CLP
 Rayleigh and Wickford CLP
 Reading East CLP
 Reading West CLP
 Redditch CLP
 Renfrewshire North and West CLP
 Renfrewshire South CLP
 Rhondda CLP
 Ribble Valley CLP
 Richmond Park CLP
 Richmond (Yorks) CLP
 Rochdale CLP
 Rochester and Strood CLP
 Rochford and Southend East CLP
 Romsey and Southampton North CLP
 Rossendale and Darwen CLP
 Runnymede and Weybridge CLP
 Rutherglen CLP
 Rutland and Melton CLP
 Salisbury CLP
 Saffron Walden CLP
 Scarborough and Whitby CLP
 Scunthorpe CLP
 Selby and Ainsty CLP
 Sevenoaks CLP
 Sheffield Central CLP
 Sheffield Hallam CLP
 Sheffield South East CLP
 Shipley CLP
 Shrewsbury and Atcham CLP
 Sittingbourne and Sheppey CLP
 Skipton and Ripon CLP
 Skye, Lochaber and Badenoch CLP
 Sleaford and North Hykeham CLP
 Solihull CLP
 Somerford and Frome CLP
 South Cambridgeshire CLP
 South Dorset CLP
 South East Cornwall CLP
 South Leicestershire CLP
 South Northamptonshire CLP
 South Shields CLP
 South Staffordshire CLP
 South Suffolk CLP
 South Swindon CLP
 South West Norfolk CLP
 South West Surrey CLP
 South West Wiltshire CLP
 Southampton Test CLP
 Spelthorne CLP
 St Albans CLP
 St Helens North CLP
 Stafford CLP
 Stalybridge and Hyde CLP
 Stevenage CLP
 Stirling CLP
 Stockton North CLP
 Stoke-on-Trent South CLP
 Stone CLP
 Stourbridge CLP
 Strathkelvin and Bearsden CLP
 Stratford-on-Avon CLP
 Streatham CLP
 Stroud CLP
 Suffolk Coastal CLP
 Sunderland Central CLP
 Sutton Coldfield CLP
 Swansea East CLP
 Swansea West CLP
 Tamworth CLP
 Tatton CLP
 Taunton Deane CLP
 Telford CLP
 Tewkesbury CLP
 The Cotswolds CLP
 Thirsk and Malton CLP
 Thurrock CLP
 Tiverton and Honiton CLP
 Tonbridge and Malling CLP
 Torbay CLP
 Torfaen CLP
 Truro and Falmouth CLP
 Tunbridge Wells CLP
 Twickenham CLP
 Tynemouth CLP
 Vale of Clwyd CLP
 Walsall North CLP
 Wantage CLP
 Warrington South CLP
 Warwick and Leamington CLP
 Washington and Sunderland West CLP
 Watford CLP
 Waveney CLP
 Wealden CLP
 Welwyn Hatfield CLP
 Wentworth and Dearne CLP
 West Bromwich East CLP
 West Worcestershire CLP
 Westminster North CLP
 Wimbledon CLP
 Winchester CLP
 Witham CLP
 Witney CLP
 Woking CLP
 Wolverhampton South East CLP
 Worcester CLP
 Workington CLP
 Wrekin CLP
 Wrexham CLP
 Wyre and Preston North CLP
 Wyre Forest CLP
 Ynys Môn CLP
 York Central CLP

Affiliated trades unions 
 Community
 Musicians' Union (MU)
 Transport Salaried Staffs' Association (TSSA)
 Union of Shop, Distributive and Allied Workers (USDAW)
 Unison

Socialist societies 
 BAME Labour
 Christians on the Left
 Labour Business
 Labour Campaign for International Development
 Labour Housing Group
 Labour Movement for Europe (LME)
 Labour Party Irish Society
 Scientists for Labour
 Socialist Environment and Resources Association (SERA)
 Socialist Health Association

Emily Thornberry (eliminated)

Members of Parliament 

 Dawn Butler, MP for Brent Central and shadow secretary of state for women and equalities
 Alex Davies-Jones, MP for Pontypridd
 Nia Griffith, shadow defence secretary and MP for Llanelli
 Fabian Hamilton, shadow foreign minister and MP for Leeds North East
 Meg Hillier, MP for Hackney South and Shoreditch
 Gerald Jones, shadow defence minister and MP for Merthyr Tydfil and Rhymney
 Afzal Khan, MP for Manchester Gorton
 Khalid Mahmood, MP for Birmingham Perry Barr and shadow minister of state for Europe
 Rachael Maskell, MP for York Central (initially nominated Clive Lewis)
 James Murray, MP for Ealing North
 Charlotte Nichols, MP for Warrington North
 Chi Onwurah, MP for Newcastle upon Tyne Central and shadow minister for industrial strategy
 Yasmin Qureshi, MP for Bolton South East
 Matt Rodda, MP for Reading East
 Naz Shah, MP for Bradford West
 Alex Sobel, MP for Leeds North West
 Gareth Thomas, MP for Harrow West
 Emily Thornberry (self)
 Liz Twist, MP for Blaydon
 Catherine West, MP for Hornsey and Wood Green
 Matt Western, MP for Warwick and Leamington
 Nadia Whittome, MP for Nottingham East (initially nominated Clive Lewis)

Members of the European Parliament 
 Julie Ward, MEP for North West England (initially nominated Clive Lewis)

Constituency Labour Parties 

 Arfon CLP
 Bishop Auckland CLP
 Brentwood and Ongar CLP
 Broadland CLP
 Canterbury CLP
 Cardiff North CLP
 Carmarthen West and South Pembrokeshire CLP
 Cowdenbeath CLP
 Eastleigh CLP
 Esher and Walton CLP
 Ettrick, Roxburgh and Berwickshire CLP
 Falkirk East CLP
 Forest of Dean CLP
 Gateshead CLP
 Guildford CLP
 Horsham CLP
 Islington South and Finsbury CLP
 Northern Ireland LP
 Midlothian North and Musselburgh CLP
 Newbury CLP
 North Cornwall CLP
 Reigate CLP
 Rugby CLP
 Rushcliffe CLP
 St Ives CLP
 South Ribble CLP
 Southport CLP
 Surrey Heath CLP
 Totnes CLP
 Vale of Glamorgan CLP
 West Lancashire CLP

Jess Phillips (withdrawn)

Members of Parliament 

 Tonia Antoniazzi, MP for Gower
 Chris Bryant, MP for Rhondda
 Liam Byrne, shadow digital minister and MP for Birmingham Hodge Hill
 Ruth Cadbury, MP for Brentford and Isleworth
 Neil Coyle, MP for Bermondsey and Old Southwark
 Rosie Duffield, MP for Canterbury
 Julie Elliott, MP for Sunderland Central
 Colleen Fletcher, Opposition Whip and MP for Coventry North East
 Margaret Hodge, MP for Barking
 Darren Jones, MP for Bristol North West
 Liz Kendall, MP for Leicester West
 Peter Kyle, MP for Hove
 Holly Lynch, MP for Halifax
 Siobhain McDonagh, MP for Mitcham and Morden
 Pat McFadden, MP for Wolverhampton South East
 Alison McGovern, MP for Wirral South
 Catherine McKinnell, MP for Newcastle upon Tyne North
 Ian Murray, MP for Edinburgh South
 Jess Phillips (self)
 Rachel Reeves, MP for Leeds West
 Wes Streeting, MP for Ilford North

Members of the European Parliament 
 Seb Dance, MEP for London
 John Howarth, MEP for South East England

Clive Lewis (withdrawn)

Members of Parliament 
 Clive Lewis (self)
 Rachael Maskell, shadow employment rights secretary and MP for York Central (subsequently nominated Emily Thornberry)
 Lloyd Russell-Moyle, MP for Brighton Kemptown (subsequently nominated Rebecca Long-Bailey)
 Nadia Whittome, MP for Nottingham East (subsequently nominated Emily Thornberry)

Members of the European Parliament 
 Julie Ward, MEP for North West England (subsequently nominated Emily Thornberry)

See also
 Nominations in the 2020 Labour Party deputy leadership election

References 

2020 in the United Kingdom
2020 Labour Party leadership election
Political endorsements in the United Kingdom
Labour Party leadership election